The term Seriphus may refer to:
 Serifos, an island municipality in Greece
 Seriphus (fish), a genus of fish